Gerardo Pisarello Prados (born 1970) is a Spanish-Argentine politician and jurist, member of the 13th Congress of Deputies. A member of Barcelona en Comú, he served as First Deputy Mayor of Barcelona between 2015 and 2019, with responsibility for Work, Economy and Strategic Planning.

Political and academic career 
A former professor in constitutional law at the University of Barcelona, he was elected to the Barcelona City Council as part of the Barcelona en Comú municipal platform.

He is the author of numerous books on constitutionalism, human rights and the right to the city and writes for Público, Eldiario.es and Sin Permiso.

Pisarello was vice president of the DESC Observatory for over ten years and was one of the founding members of the anti-capitalist and pro-independence Procés Constituent.

He is a member of the Advisory Panel of DiEM25.

References

Barcelona municipal councillors (2015–2019)
Living people
Members of the 13th Congress of Deputies (Spain)
1970 births
Members of the 14th Congress of Deputies (Spain)
Spanish people of Argentine descent